The 1932 Boston Red Sox season was the 32nd season in the franchise's Major League Baseball (MLB) history. The team's home field was Fenway Park. The Red Sox finished last in the eight-team American League (AL) with a record of 43 wins and 111 losses, 64 games behind the New York Yankees, who went on to win the 1932 World Series.

The Red Sox initially played their Sunday home games at Braves Field this season, as had been the case since the team's 1929 season, due to Fenway being close to a house of worship. The team played a total of six home games at Braves Field during the 1932 season; an early-season Tuesday doubleheader against the New York Yankees, and four Sunday games. A new Massachusetts law was enacted in late May that allowed the team to play at Fenway on Sundays. The final game the Red Sox ever played at Braves Field was on May 29, 1932, when they lost the second game of a doubleheader to the Philadelphia Athletics. The Red Sox' first Sunday home game at Fenway was played on July 3, 1932, a 13–2 loss to the Yankees.

The 1932 team set a franchise record for the lowest winning percentage in a season, .279, which still stands. The team allowed 915 runs while only scoring 566, a run differential of -349, the worst in MLB's modern era (since 1900).

Regular season

Season standings

Record vs. opponents

Opening Day lineup

Roster

Player stats

Batting

Starters by position 
Note: Pos = Position; G = Games played; AB = At bats; H = Hits; Avg. = Batting average; HR = Home runs; RBI = Runs batted in

Other batters 
Note: G = Games played; AB = At bats; H = Hits; Avg. = Batting average; HR = Home runs; RBI = Runs batted in

Pitching

Starting pitchers 
Note: G = Games pitched; IP = Innings pitched; W = Wins; L = Losses; ERA = Earned run average; SO = Strikeouts

Other pitchers 
Note: G = Games pitched; IP = Innings pitched; W = Wins; L = Losses; ERA = Earned run average; SO = Strikeouts

Relief pitchers 
Note: G = Games pitched; W = Wins; L = Losses; SV = Saves; ERA = Earned run average; SO = Strikeouts

Farm system

See also 
 List of Boston Red Sox team records

References

External links 
1932 Boston Red Sox team page at Baseball Reference
1932 Boston Red Sox season at baseball-almanac.com

Boston Red Sox seasons
Boston Red Sox
Boston Red Sox
1930s in Boston